Scythris rumurutiensis is a moth of the family Scythrididae. It was described by Bengt Å. Bengtsson in 2014. It is found in Ethiopia and Kenya.

References

rumurutiensis
Moths described in 2014